Santa Colomba de Curueño (Santa Colomba de Curueñu, in Leonese language) is a municipality located in the province of León, Castile and León, Spain. According to the 2004 census (INE), the municipality has a population of 601 inhabitants.

References

Municipalities in the Province of León